Güre  is a belde (town) in the central district of Uşak Province, Turkey. At  it is on the Turkish state highway  which connects İzmir to Ankara. The population of Güre  is 1064  as of 2011. Güre is known as the home town of the (so called) " Treasures of Croesus" findings from Lydian tumuli around the town. The findings were plundered in the 1960s but recovered by the 2000s and now they are being kept in Uşak Museum.

References

Populated places in Uşak Province
Towns in Turkey
Uşak Central District